Pehuensat-1 is a satellite built entirely in Argentina with educational objectives. It was launched on January 10, 2007 aboard a rocket from the Satish Dhawan Space Center on the east coast of India. The assembly took five years and was carried out by teachers and students of the National University of Comahue.

It was named Pehuensat-1 in reference to the pehuén, an ancient and native tree of the Andean Patagonian forests identified with the provinces in which the university has its academic headquarters.

Details 
It was built by 17 teachers and 44 students from the Faculty of Engineering of the University of Comahue (Neuquén). In October 2006, the satellite was taken to the launch center in Shriharikota (India), by the Argentine space researcher Pablo de León, who became known months ago when he presented a prototype of a space suit designed for trips to Mars.

It was launched at 9:23 a.m. Indian time (1:53 a.m. Argentine time) on the Indian Polar Satellite Launch Vehicle (PSL-7) rocket.

After 20 minutes of travel, Pehuensat-1 reached its orbit, where it will remain -according to the technicians- for "several years".

It has a space-type aluminum case structure and solar panels on one of the faces. The electronics are made up of a transmitter, a computer and two battery packs that are recharged with solar energy. In addition, an antenna in charge of transmitting the satellite parameters to the ground.

It will be useful to high schools and universities around the world, because it transmits its data in multiple languages ​​to amateur radio receivers. When flying over an area, The satellite only needs to tune to the 145.825 MHz frequency in the 2-meter band in FM mode. The Pehuensat-1 satellite transmits its data in Spanish, English and Hindi.

References 

Satellites